Esplantas-Vazeilles is a commune in the Haute-Loire department in south-central France. The municipality was established on 1 January 2016 and consists of the former communes of Esplantas and Vazeilles-près-Saugues.

Population

See also 
Communes of the Haute-Loire department

References 

Communes of Haute-Loire
Communes nouvelles of Haute-Loire
Populated places established in 2016

2016 establishments in France